The glymphatic system (or glymphatic clearance pathway, or paravascular system) was described and named in 2012 as a system for waste clearance in the central nervous system (CNS) of vertebrates. According to this model, cerebrospinal fluid (CSF) flows into the paravascular space around cerebral arteries, combining with interstitial fluid (ISF) and parenchymal solutes, and exiting down venous paravascular spaces. The pathway consists of a para-arterial influx route for CSF to enter the brain parenchyma, coupled to a clearance mechanism for the removal of interstitial fluid (ISF) and extracellular solutes from the interstitial compartments of the brain and spinal cord. Exchange of solutes between CSF and ISF is driven primarily by arterial pulsation and regulated during sleep by the expansion and contraction of brain extracellular space. Clearance of soluble proteins, waste products, and excess extracellular fluid is accomplished through convective bulk flow of ISF, facilitated by astrocytic aquaporin 4 (AQP4) water channels.

The name "glymphatic system" was coined by the Danish neuroscientist Maiken Nedergaard in recognition of its dependence upon glial cells and the similarity of its functions to those of the peripheral lymphatic system.

Glymphatic flow was initially believed to be the complete answer to the long-standing question of how the sensitive neural tissue of the CNS functions in the perceived absence of a lymphatic drainage pathway for extracellular proteins, excess fluid, and metabolic waste products. However, two subsequent articles by Louveau et al. from the University of Virginia School of Medicine and Aspelund et al. from the University of Helsinki reported independently that the dural sinuses and meningeal arteries are lined with conventional lymphatic vessels, and that this long-elusive vasculature forms a connecting pathway to the glymphatic system.

Proposed structure

In a study published in 2012, a group of researchers from the University of Rochester, headed by M. Nedergaard, used in-vivo two-photon imaging of small fluorescent tracers to monitor the flow of subarachnoid CSF into and through the brain parenchyma.  The two-photon microscopy allowed the Rochester team to visualize the flux of CSF in living mice, in real time, without needing to puncture the CSF compartment (imaging was performed through a closed cranial window).  According to findings of that study, subarachnoid CSF enters the brain rapidly, along the paravascular spaces surrounding the penetrating arteries, then exchanges with the surrounding interstitial fluid. Similarly, interstitial fluid is cleared from the brain parenchyma via the paravascular spaces surrounding large draining veins.

Paravascular spaces are CSF-filled channels formed between the brain blood vessels and leptomeningeal sheathes that surround cerebral surface vessels and proximal penetrating vessels. Around these penetrating vessels, paravascular spaces take the form of Virchow-Robin spaces. Where the Virchow-Robin spaces terminate within the brain parenchyma, paravascular CSF can continue traveling along the basement membranes surrounding arterial vascular smooth muscle, to reach the basal lamina surrounding brain capillaries. CSF movement along these paravascular pathways is rapid and arterial pulsation has long been suspected as an important driving force for paravascular fluid movement. In a study published in 2013, J. Iliff and colleagues demonstrated this directly. Using in vivo 2-photon microscopy, the authors reported that when cerebral arterial pulsation was either increased or decreased, the rate of paravacular CSF flux in turn increased or decreased, respectively.

Astrocytes extend long processes that interface with neuronal synapses, as well as projections referred to as 'end-feet' that completely ensheathe the brain's entire vasculature. Although the exact mechanism is not completely understood, astrocytes are known to facilitate changes in blood flow  and have long been thought to play a role in waste removal in the brain. Researchers have long known that astrocytes express water channels called aquaporins. Until recently, however, no physiological function had been identified that explained their presence in the astrocytes of the mammalian CNS. Aquaporins are membrane-bound channels that play critical roles in regulating the flux of water into and out of cells. Relative to simple diffusion, the presence of aquaporins in biological membranes facilitates a 3– to 10-fold increase in water permeability.
Two types of aquaporins are expressed in the CNS: aquaporin-1, which is expressed by specialized epithelial cells of the choroid plexus, and aquaporin-4 (AQP4), which is expressed by astrocytes. Aquaporin-4 expression in astrocytes is highly polarized to the endfoot processes ensheathing the cerebral vasculature. Up to 50% of the vessel-facing endfoot surface that faces the vasculature is occupied by orthogonal arrays of AQP4.
In 2012, it was shown that AQP4 is essential for paravascular CSF–ISF exchange. Analysis of genetically modified mice that lacked the AQP4 gene revealed that the bulk flow-dependent clearance of interstitial solutes decreases by 70% in the absence of AQP4. Based upon this role of AQP4-dependent glial water transport in the process of paravascular interstitial solute clearance, Iliff and Nedergaard termed this brain-wide glio-vascular pathway the "glymphatic system".

Function

Waste clearance during sleep 
A publication by L. Xie and colleagues in 2013 explored the efficiency of the glymphatic system during slow wave sleep and provided the first direct evidence that the clearance of interstitial waste products increases during the resting state. Using a combination of diffusion iontophoresis techniques pioneered by Nicholson and colleagues, in vivo 2-photon imaging, and electroencephalography to confirm the wake and sleep states, Xia and Nedergaard demonstrated that the changes in efficiency of CSF–ISF exchange between the awake and sleeping brain were caused by expansion and contraction of the extracellular space, which increased by ~60% in the sleeping brain to promote clearance of interstitial wastes such as amyloid beta. On the basis of these findings, they hypothesized that the restorative properties of sleep may be linked to increased glymphatic clearance of metabolic waste products produced by neural activity in the awake brain.

Lipid transport
Another key function of the glymphatic system was documented by Thrane et al., who, in 2013, demonstrated that the brain's system of paravascular pathways plays an important role in transporting small lipophilic molecules. Led by M. Nedergaard, Thrane and colleagues also showed that the paravascular transport of lipids through the glymphatic pathway activated glial calcium signalling and that the depressurization of the cranial cavity, and thus impairment of the glymphatic circulation, led to unselective lipid diffusion, intracellular lipid accumulation, and pathological signalling among astrocytes. Although further experiments are needed to parse out the physiological significance of the connection between the glymphatic circulation, calcium signalling, and paravascular lipid transport in the brain, the findings point to the adoption of a function in the CNS similar to the capacity of the intestinal lymph vessels (lacteals) to carry lipids to the liver.

Clinical significance
Pathologically, neurodegenerative diseases such as amyotrophic lateral sclerosis, Alzheimer's disease, Parkinson's disease, and Huntington's disease are all characterized by the progressive loss of neurons, cognitive decline, motor impairments, and sensory loss. Collectively these diseases fall within a broad category referred to as proteinopathies due to the common assemblage of misfolded or aggregated intracellular or extracellular proteins. According to the prevailing amyloid hypothesis of Alzheimer's disease, the aggregation of amyloid-beta (a peptide normally produced in and cleared from the healthy young brain) into extracellular plaques drives the neuronal loss and brain atrophy that is the hallmark of Alzheimer's dementia. Although the full extent of the involvement of the glymphatic system in Alzheimer's disease and other neurodegenerative disorders remains unclear, researchers have demonstrated through experiments with genetically modified mice that the proper function of the glymphatic clearance system was necessary to remove soluble amyloid-beta from the brain interstitium. In mice that lack the AQP4 gene, amyloid-beta clearance is reduced by approximately 55 percent.

The glymphatic system also may be impaired after acute brain injuries such as ischemic stroke, intracranial hemorrhage, or subarachnoid hemorrhage. In 2014, a group of researchers from the French Institute of Health and Medical Research (INSERM) demonstrated by MRI that the glymphatic system was impaired after subarachnoid hemorrhage, because of the presence of coagulated blood in the paravascular spaces. Injection of tissue plasminogen activator (a fibrinolytic drug) in the CSF improved glymphatic functioning. In a parallel study, they also demonstrated that the glymphatic system was impaired after ischemic stroke in the ischemic hemisphere, although the pathophysiological basis of this phenomenon remains unclear. Notably, recanalization of the occluded artery also reestablished the glymphatic flow.

The glymphatic system may also be involved in the pathogenesis of amyotrophic lateral sclerosis.

History

Description of the cerebrospinal fluid
Although the first known observations of the CSF date back to Hippocrates (460–375 BCE) and later, to Galen (130–200 CE), its discovery is credited to Emanuel Swedenborg (1688–1772 CE), who, being a devoutly religious man, identified the CSF during his search for the seat of the soul. The 16 centuries of anatomists who came after Hippocrates and Galen may have missed identifying the CSF due to the prevailing autopsy technique of the time, which included severing the head and draining the blood before dissecting the brain. Although Swedenborg's work (in translation) was not published until 1887 due to his lack of medical credentials, he also may have made the first connection between the CSF and the lymphatic system. His description of the CSF was of a "spirituous lymph".

CNS lymphatics
In the peripheral organs, the lymphatic system performs important immune functions and runs parallel to the blood circulatory system to provide a secondary circulation that transports excess interstitial fluid, proteins, and metabolic waste products from the systemic tissues back into the blood. The efficient removal of soluble proteins from the interstitial fluid is critical to the regulation of both colloidal osmotic pressure and homeostatic regulation of the fluid volume of the body. The importance of lymphatic flow is especially evident when the lymphatic system becomes obstructed. In lymphatic associated diseases, such as elephantiasis (where parasites occupying the lymphatic vessels block the flow of lymph), the impact of such an obstruction may be dramatic. The resulting chronic edema is due to the breakdown of lymphatic clearance and the accumulation of interstitial solutes.

In 2015, the presence of a meningeal lymphatic system was first identified. Downstream of the glymphatic system's waste clearance from the ISF to the CSF, the meningeal lymphatic system drains fluid from the glymphatic system to the meningeal compartment and deep cervical lymph nodes. The meningeal lymphatics also carry immune cells. The extent to which these cells may interact directly with the brain or glymphatic system, is unknown.

Diffusion hypothesis
For more than a century the prevailing hypothesis was that the flow of cerebrospinal fluid (CSF), which surrounds, but does not come in direct contact with the parenchyma of the CNS, could replace peripheral lymphatic functions and play an important role in the clearance of extracellular solutes.
The majority of the CSF is formed in the choroid plexus and flows through the brain along a distinct pathway: moving through the cerebral ventricular system, into the subarachnoid space surrounding the brain, then draining into the systemic blood column via arachnoid granulations of the dural sinuses or to peripheral lymphatics along cranial nerve sheathes. Many researchers have suggested that the CSF compartment constitutes a sink for interstitial solute and fluid clearance from the brain parenchyma. However, the distances between the interstitial fluid and the CSF in the ventricles and subarachnoid space are too great for the efficient removal of interstitial macromolecules and wastes by simple diffusion alone. Helen Cserr at Brown University calculated that mean diffusion times for large molecules, such as albumin, would exceed 100 hours to traverse 1 cm of brain tissue, a rate that is not compatible with the intense metabolic demands of brain tissue. Additionally, a  clearance system based on simple diffusion would lack the sensitivity to respond rapidly to deviations from homeostatic conditions.

Key determinants of diffusion through the brain interstitial spaces are the dimensions and composition of the extracellular compartment. In a series of elegantly designed experiments in the 1980s and 1990s, C. Nicholson and colleagues from New York University explored the microenvironment of the extracellular space using ion-selective micropipettes and ionophoretic point sources. Using these techniques Nicholson showed that solute and water movement through the brain parenchyma slows as the extracellular volume fraction decreases and becomes more tortuous.

As an alternative explanation to diffusion, Cserr and colleagues proposed that convective bulk flow of interstitial fluid from the brain parenchyma to the CSF was responsible for efficient waste clearance.

Progress in the field of CSF dynamics
Experiments conducted at the University of Maryland in the 1980s by Patricia Grady and colleagues postulated the existence of solute exchange between the interstitial fluid of the brain parenchyma and the CSF via paravascular spaces. In 1985, Grady and colleagues suggested that cerebrospinal fluid and interstitial fluid exchange along specific anatomical pathways within the brain, with CSF moving into the brain along the outside of blood vessels. Grady's group suggested that these 'paravascular channels' were functionally analogous to peripheral lymph vessels, facilitating the clearance of interstitial wastes from the brain. However, other laboratories at the time did not observe such widespread paravascular CSF–ISF exchange.

The continuity between the brain interstitial fluid and the CSF was confirmed by H. Cserr and colleagues from Brown University and King's College London. The same group postulated that interstitial solutes in the brain parenchyma exchange with CSF via a bulk flow mechanism, rather than diffusion. However other work from this same laboratory indicated that the exchange of CSF with interstitial fluid was inconsistent and minor, contradicting the findings of Grady and colleagues.

References

Further reading 

 
 
 

Lymphatic system
Central nervous system
Articles containing video clips